Davit Volkovi (Georgian: დავით ვოლკოვი; born 3 June 1995) is a Georgian footballer who plays as striker for Sabah in the Azerbaijan Premier League.

Club career

Georgia
Born in Georgian capital Tbilisi, Volkovi played the 2012–13 season with FC Gagra in the Georgian Premier League scoring 10 goals in 26 appearances.  Being only 18 at the time, it was no surprise local power-house FC Dinamo Tbilisi brought him at the end of the season. Initially, he played mostly for the second team which was competing in second level, the Pirveli Liga. By the end of his second year at reserves team, he was incorporated to the first team in the second half of the 2014–15 season. He started the 2015–16 Umaglesi Liga as part of the main team and made 3 appearances as contribution for Dinamo Tbilisi winning their 16th national title, however the challenge for a spot in the starting eleven was huge with Dinamo having numerous experienced national team strikers, so during winter-break, Volkovi accepted a loan to FC Chikhura Sachkhere where he will play the second half of the season and score 4 goals in 8 appearances helping them finish 4th and qualify to the UEFA Europa League. Instead of spending most time sitting in the glorious Dinamo Tbilisi bench waiting to be the substitute of some glorious Georgian football star striker, Volkovi enjoyed being helpful and leading the attack in other teams where he would have more space, so for the restructured 2016 Umaglesi Liga he accepted being loaned to FC Sioni Bolnisi, a club that in the past had good results in the league. However, Sioni ended relegated, but Volkovi by scoring 6 goals in 14 games ended as 4th best league topscorer.

Serbia
At the end of the season he returned to Dinamo Tbilisi, and in February 2017 he accepted a permanent move abroad, to Serbia, to second-tier side FK Zemun. Zemun was by then in the winter-break of the 2016–17 Serbian First League season with good prospects of achieving promotion to the Serbian SuperLiga. It took Volkovi some time to debut, and it was in the last round, and he debuted by scoring a goal and with Zemun finishing second and achieving promotion to the 2017–18 Serbian SuperLiga.

Return to Georgia
After spending half a season at the bench in Serbian second tier, Volkovi was hungry of scoring goals. He had already demonstrated that when in the last round Zemun gave him a chance and he scored in his only league appearance. Zemun got the promotion, but with the uncertainty if he will receive a first team starter status or risk continuing on the bench, in summer 2017, Volkovi decided to return to Georgia and signed with top league side FC Saburtalo Tbilisi. He was a starter in the goalless first-round game against FC Kolkheti-1913 Poti but already in the second round Volkovi confirmed his goal-scoring skills and made a hattrick in a 6–0 victory against FC Locomotive Tbilisi.

Gabala
On 11 January 2019, Volkovi signed for Gabala from Saburtalo Tbilisi on a one-year contract.

Zira
On 21 December 2019, Zira FK announced the singing of Volkovi on an 18-month contract starting 1 January 2020.

Sabah
On 12 June 2022, Sabah announced the singing of Volkovi to a two-year contract.

International career
He made his debut for Georgia national football team on 11 November 2021 in a World Cup qualifier against Sweden, a 2–0 home victory for Georgia. He scored his first international goal four days later, the only goal in a friendly 1–0 victory over Uzbekistan.

Career statistics

Club

International

Georgia score listed first, score column indicates score after each Volkovi goal

Honours
Dinamo Tbilisi
Georgian Cup: 2015
Georgian Super Cup: 2015

Gabala
 Azerbaijan Cup: 2018–19

References

External links
Erovnuli Liga · Official website ·
FC Dinamo Tbilisi · Official website
FC Saburtalo · Official website ·
FootballDatabase.eu

Gabala FK · Official website ·

Sports.ru

Zerozero.pt
sportall.ge ·

1995 births
Living people
Footballers from Tbilisi
Footballers from Georgia (country)
Georgia (country) international footballers
Association football forwards
FC Gagra players
FC Dinamo Tbilisi players
FC Chikhura Sachkhere players
FC Sioni Bolnisi players
FC Saburtalo Tbilisi players
Erovnuli Liga players
Expatriate footballers from Georgia (country)
FK Zemun players
Serbian First League players
Expatriate footballers in Serbia
Azerbaijan Premier League players
Gabala FC players
Expatriate sportspeople from Georgia (country) in Azerbaijan